Jean-Pierre Cubertafon is a French politician of the Democratic Movement (MoDem) who was elected to the French National Assembly on 18 June 2017, representing the department of Dordogne.

Political career
In parliament, Cubertafon has been serving on the Defence Committee. In addition to his committee assignment, he is part of the French-Armenian Parliamentary Friendship Group, the French-Bolivian Parliamentary Friendship Group and the French-Moroccan Parliamentary Friendship Group.

In 2021, Cubertafon received anonymous death threats.

See also
 2017 French legislative election

References

Year of birth missing (living people)
Living people
Deputies of the 15th National Assembly of the French Fifth Republic
Democratic Movement (France) politicians
Place of birth missing (living people)
Members of Parliament for Dordogne
Deputies of the 16th National Assembly of the French Fifth Republic